Ngozi Nwosu (born 1 August 1963) is a veteran Nigerian actress and producer. She began her acting career in Yoruba-language films, before making her home-video debut in Living in Bondage, an Igbo-language film considered to begin the video film era of Cinema of Nigeria.

Personal life 
A native of Arochukwu in Abia State, Southeastern Nigeria, Nwosu was born 1 August 1963. She grew up in Lagos. Her father, a Biafran veteran was killed during the Nigeria Civil War. Nwosu is fluent in Igbo, Yoruba and English languages. She had her primary education at St. Paul Anglican School, Idi Oro. She then proceeded to Maryland Comprehensive High School, Ikeja, and concluded her high school at East Rosary High School. Her professional acting training under the leadership of Reverend Fabian Oko was done at Royal Theatre Art Club School.  In 2012, she took ill, which affected her career. The diagnosis was reported to be related to a kidney disease. She eventually got treatment abroad through government and some organizations.

Career 
She began her acting career while attending acting classes in school, most of which were done in Yoruba. She played "Madam V boot" in the television series, Ripples. While on set in Living in Bondage, Nwosu is attributed as being the first actress to kiss on set during her romantic session with Kenneth Okonkwo. She is also known for playing "Peace" in sitcom, Fuji House of Commotion (created by Amaka Igwe). Her character was the second wife of Chief T. A. Fuji, often shown as his favourite. In 2018, she played "Ene" in Nigerian animation film Sade. Her character is a woman who didn't utilize what she has until she lost it. According to her, everyone can identify with the film because of its comedic tone. She was the producer of Evil Passion, Stainless and the radio show, Onga. Speaking on female sexual harassment in the industry, Ngozi Nwosu explained that it could be fine when producers make sexual advances toward an actress, but she considers it more demeaning when the actress seduces the producer. She also stated that every actress has the right to say no to anything that is not comfortable for them. She has also featured in music videos for Chidinma Ekile, Fair Prince and Davido. She is also on set for Ndani.

Filmography 
Light in the Dark (2018), is a feature film featuring Joke Silvia, Rita Dominic, Angel Unigwe among others. She also featured in The Silent Baron and Crazy Grannies.

See also
 List of Nigerian actors
 List of Nigerian film producers

References

External links 
 

Living people
1963 births
20th-century Nigerian actresses
21st-century Nigerian actresses
Nigerian film actresses
Nigerian film producers
Nigerian women film producers
Igbo actresses
Yoruba actresses
Actresses from Abia State